An air data boom provides air pressure, temperature, and airflow direction data to data acquisition systems for the computation of air, ground, and water vehicle orientation, speed, altitude/depth, and related information. Air data booms can be used as primary sensors or as a "measurement standard" of which primary sensors and instruments are compared to.

Purpose and overview 
An air data boom is used to collect source data during the testing of air vehicles, ground vehicles, and water-borne vessels. The air data boom is mounted on the vehicle in a location that allows for relatively undisturbed air to be measured. To attain such undisturbed air, mounting is usually done on the nose, wing, or upper horizontal stabilizer of the vehicle.

Typical components 

Air data booms may measure one, some, or all of these capabilities:
 angle of attack (AoA, alpha)
 angle of sideslip (AoS, beta)
 static pressure (Ps)
 total pressure (Pt, pitot pressure)
 outside air temperature (OAT)
 total air temperature (TAT)

Specialized air data booms may also contain mission-specific sensors such as humidity sensors, ice detectors, accelerometers, strain gages, and the like.

Synonyms 
An air data boom may be referred to by a variety of names, including:
 flight test boom
 vehicle test boom
 nose boom
 wing boom
 YAPS head (for Yaw-And-Pitch Sensor head)

Manufacturers 
Most air data booms are either procured from niche manufacturers such as SpaceAge Control, Goodrich,, or created by vehicle manufacturers, R&D facilities, and test organizations.

See also 
 Flight test
 Flight test instrumentation
 Angle of attack
 Pitot-static system
 Pitot tube
 Total air temperature

References 

 Airdata Measurement and Calibration
 Calibration of Air Data Systems and Flow Direction Sensors
 Wind-Tunnel Calibration of a Combined Pitot-Static Tube and Vane-Type Flow-Angularity Indicator at Mach Numbers of 1.61 and 2.01

Aircraft components
Sensors